Gregory C. Welch is a Canadian chemist, currently a Canada Research Chair at University of Calgary.

References

Year of birth missing (living people)
Living people
Academic staff of the University of Calgary
Canadian chemists
University of Calgary alumni
University of Windsor alumni